HD 3 is a single, white-hued star in the northern constellation Andromeda. With an apparent visual magnitude of 6.71, it is below the nominal brightness limit for visibility with the typical naked eye but may still be visible by some observers under ideal viewing conditions. It is also the first star indexed in the Bright Star Catalogue.

The stellar classification of this star is A1 Vn, indicating it is an  A-type main-sequence star with "nebulous" lines due to rapid rotation. It is a Lambda Boötis candidate star, being classified as chemically-peculiar by Abt & Morrell (1995). Murphy et al. (2015) list the membership likelihood as uncertain. HD 3 has 2.36 times the mass of the Sun and about 1.9 times the Sun's radius. It is spinning with a projected rotational velocity of 228 km/s. The star is radiating around 43.5 times the Sun's luminosity from its photosphere at an effective temperature of about 9,057 K.

HD 3 has two visual companions. Component B is a magnitude 13.70 star at an angular separation of  along a position angle (PA) of 107°, as of 2016. The third star, component C, is magnitude 10.58	and lies at a separation of  along a PA of 235°, also as of 2016.

References

External links
 

A-type main-sequence stars
Lambda Boötis stars
Andromeda (constellation)
Durchmusterung objects
000003
0001
000424